The ATS 2500 GT is a sports car made by Italian company Automobili Turismo e Sport in Bologna. It was the first Italian and one of the first GT or sports car in the world to have a mid-engine layout. The group behind the ATS project consisted mainly of Ferrari defectors:  family troubles had created an uncomfortable working atmosphere for the personnel. ATS, intent on beating Ferrari on all fronts, also produced a Formula One car for 1963, "a ghastly mess, one of the most inept racing cars ever, and its appalling performances did not help the road car." Even noted driver Phil Hill was unable to provide ATS with any results on track.

History
The space frame 2500 GT was introduced in 1963 at the Paris Motor Show. Designed by Franco Scaglione and engineered by Carlo Chiti and Giotto Bizzarrini, the car was built only in limited numbers before investors withdrew financial support and the project collapsed. The car's drawings were later used for Count Volpi's (an early backer) failed Serenissima sportcars project. A Moreno Baldi attempted another revival of the ATS concept in 1970, and failed even more disastrously.

A competition version (ATS 2500 GTS) produced  but never amounted to much. The coachwork was by Allemano, and the 5-speed transmission by Colotti.

Revival effort
In 2012, there was an attempt to re-establish ATS. Digital images of a newly designed 2500 GT were shown, with a 2.5 L turbocharged flat-four engine (a Cosworth-tuned Subaru flat-four claimed to produce 500 hp). The car never entered production. in 2017, ATS announced another model, a spiritual successor to the original 2500 GT called the ATS GT. The new GT is based on the McLaren 12C and ATS had hopes to enter production in 2019.

References

Sources
 

Cars of Italy
Cars introduced in 1963
Rear mid-engine, rear-wheel-drive vehicles
Sports cars